Dr. Mohammad Yusuf Khan (January 21, 1917 – January 23, 1998) was Prime Minister and Foreign Minister of Afghanistan from March 10, 1963 to November 2, 1965. He was a technocrat who served under the reign of Mohammed Zahir Shah, and was the first Afghan prime minister not to be part of the royal family. He resigned on October 29, 1965.

Yusuf's predecessor, Mohammed Daoud Khan, had made him Minister of Mines and Industries in 1953, a position in which he would serve for 10 years (prior to which he had been Deputy Minister of Education from 1949 to 1953). After serving as prime minister, he was appointed Ambassador to the Soviet Union, but left this post in 1973 following Daoud Khan's coup. When the Soviets invaded Afghanistan in 1979, he went into exile in Germany, where he lived until his death. His family moved to the west during the fall of the Communist Regime in Afghanistan, mostly to Canada and the United States.

Prior to entering politics, Yusuf had been a professor at Kabul University since 1949.

References

External links
Afghan statesmen

1917 births
1998 deaths
Prime Ministers of Afghanistan
Foreign ministers of Afghanistan
Industry ministers of Afghanistan
Mining ministers of Afghanistan
Afghan Tajik people